In aller Stille (in complete silence) is the eleventh studio album by the German punk band Die Toten Hosen. It's the first studio album in 4 years. The cover was designed by Dirk Rudolph. The central theme for this album is energy.

The album was released in 3 versions:
Standard Edition - regular CD
Limited Edition - CD + DVD:
 "Innen alles neu - Wie alles anfing" (Inside all new - How it all started) - a documentary
 "Strom" video
Vinyl, hand-signed by the band, limited to 2000 units

In 2009 it was awarded a diamond certification from the Independent Music Companies Association which indicated sales of at least 250,000 copies throughout Europe.

Track listing
 "Strom" (Current) (Frege/Frege) − 2:48
 "Innen alles neu" (All new inside) (Meurer/Frege) − 2:57
 "Disco" (Frege/Frege) − 3:22
 "Teil von mir" (Part of me) (von Holst/Frege) − 3:00
 "Auflösen" (Dissolve) (Frege/Frege, Minichmayr) − 3:19 (duet with Birgit Minichmayr)
 "Leben ist tödlich" (Life is deadly) (Meurer/Frege) − 3:26
 "Ertrinken" (Drowning) (Breitkopf/Frege, Weitholz) − 4:13
 "Alles was war" (All that was) (Breitkopf/Frege) − 3:05
 "Pessimist" (Breitkopf/Frege) − 2:47
 "Wir bleiben stumm" (We remain mute) (von Holst/Frege) − 3:33
 "Die letzte Schlacht" (The final battle) (von Holst, Meurer/Frege) − 3:03
 "Tauschen gegen dich" (Trade for you) (von Holst/Steingen, Frege) − 3:16
 "Angst" (Fear) (von Holst/Frege) − 3:12

Musicload bonus track
 "Das ist vorbei" (It's over) − 3:26

Singles
2008: "Strom"
2009: "Alles was war"
2009: "Auflösen"
2009: "Ertrinken"

Personnel
Campino - vocals
Andreas von Holst (Kuddel) - guitar
Michael Breitkopf (Breiti) - guitar
Andreas Meurer (Andi) - bass
Stephen George Ritchie (Vom) - drums
Raphael Zweifel - cello on 5, 12
Hans Steingen - piano, accordion, string instruments
Birgit Minichmayr - vocals on 5

Charts

Year-end charts

Certifications

References 

Die Toten Hosen albums
2008 albums
German-language albums